The Gold Chain mine is a mine located in Juab County, Utah and owned by the Gold Chain Mining Company and operated by the Mammoth Mining Company. It mines commodities such as gold, lead, zinc, copper, and silver. The mine had received a revenue of US$3,000,000 from 1899 to 1917.

References

External links
 

Gold mines in the United States
Lead mines in the United States
Zinc mines in the United States
Copper mines in the United States
Silver mines in the United States